Titãs & Paralamas Juntos ao Vivo is a live album by Brazilian rock bands Titãs and Os Paralamas do Sucesso recorded and released in 1999. It features hits from both bands, an interview with both band members and the label's jingle. It's Titãs' third live album and Paralamas' fourth. it also marks the second time both bands perform together, the first being in the 1992 edition of Hollywood Rock.

The album was recorded amidst a homonymous tour which took the bands to many cities of Brazil (Rio de Janeiro, Londrina, Porto Alegre, Sorocaba, Araras, Goiânia, Salvador, Brasília, Campinas, Vitória, Aracaju, Curitiba and São Paulo).

The series of shows (each having an estimated cost of R$300,000) was conceived by Ajom Produções and would mark the debut of Sempre Livre Mix, a project that aimed at creating one annual attraction targeting a young audience, but that did not go beyond this tour.

The first performance took place on 15 May. By the time of the tour's announcement, some guest performances from notable Brazilian female singers like Fernanda Takai (Pato Fu), Paula Toller (Kid Abelha), Cássia Eller and Rita Lee were expected to happen. During the tour, each band performed alone for 50 minutes and then joined forces for a 40-minute joint show with two drums, two basses, two brass sections and two percussionists.

Track listing

Personnel 
Adapted from the booklet:

Titãs and Os Paralamas do Sucesso 
 Branco Mello - lead vocals
 Herbert Vianna - lead vocals, guitar
 Sérgio Britto - vocals, keyboards
 Paulo Miklos - vocals, harmonica
 Marcelo Fromer - guitar
 Tony Bellotto - guitar
 Nando Reis - bass
 Bi Ribeiro - bass
 Charles Gavin - drums
 João Barone - drums

Session musicians 
Titãs
 Eduardo Morelenbaum - saxophone , keyboards
 Henrique Band - saxophone and flute
 Elias Correa - trombone
 Paulo Mendonça - trumpet
 Ricardo Imperatore - percussion

Os Paralamas do Sucesso
 João Fera - keyboards
 Biduú Cordeiro - trombone
 Demétrio Bezerra - trumpet
 Monteiro Jr. - saxophone
 Eduardo Lyra - percussion

Technical personnel 
 Ajom Produções - general direction and idealization
 Léo Garrido - musical production, recording technician, member of Paralamas technical team
 Vinícius Sá - recording technician
 Victor Farias - mixing technician
 Carlos Freitas and Flávia Toyama - mastering technicians
 Theo Mares and Jorge Guerreiro - studio assistants
 Pedro Ribeiro, Alexandre Santos, Marcos Olívio, Helder Vianna, Alejandro Bertoli, Alexndre Saieg, Jorge Carvalho, Orbílio Rosa - Paralamas technical team
 Vera Franco, João Libarino, Júlio Correa, Sérgio Molina, Sombra Jones, Viça, Lauro Silva, Marcelo Tição - Titãs technical team

References

Titãs live albums
Os Paralamas do Sucesso live albums
Collaborative albums
2000 live albums